Aglaia vitiensis is a species of plant in the family Meliaceae. It is endemic to Fiji.

References

Endemic flora of Fiji
vitiensis
Near threatened plants
Taxonomy articles created by Polbot